Uia is a locality in the Marquesas Islands.

UIA can refer to:

 Argentine Industrial Union (Unión Industrial Argentina)
 International Islamic University Malaysia (Universiti Islam Antarabangsa)
 International Union of Architects (Union internationale des Architectes)
 Microsoft UI Automation, a computer accessibility technology
 Uganda Investment Authority
 UIA Mutual, an insurance company in the United Kingdom
 Ukraine International Airlines
 Ukrainian Insurgent Army
 Unemployment Insurance Agency, the agency that oversees unemployment compensation in the U.S. state of Michigan
 Union Internationale des Avocats (International Association of Lawyers)
 Union of International Associations
 United International Airlines, a Serbian cargo airline
 United Iraqi Alliance
 United Israel Appeal
 Universidad Iberoamericana in Mexico
 University of Agder (Universitetet i Agder)
 University of Antwerp (Universitaire Instelling Antwerpen)